The Seaview is a golf club and resort on the East Coast of the United States, located in Galloway Township, New Jersey, north of nearby Atlantic City. The club hosted the ShopRite LPGA Classic in 1986-87, from 1998-2006 and again starting in 2010. During World War II, it hosted the PGA Championship in 1942, Sam Snead's first major title.  The course also cooperates with Rutgers University on testing of new turf breeds and natural control of mosquitoes.

The resort has two golf courses, Bay and Pines, and a 300-room hotel with tennis courts, swimming pools, two mini basketball courts, jogging trails, a fitness center, and a spa.

On September 1, 2010, The Richard Stockton College of New Jersey took ownership of the hotel and the Bay course.

On August 1, 2018, it was announced that The Richard Stockton College of New Jersey sold the club to Florida-based KDG Capital LLC for $21 million.

History
The golf club dates from 1914, when public utility magnate Clarence H. Geist founded the Seaview Country Club.  The original golf course, known today as the Bay Course, was partially designed by Hugh Wilson (who also designed the two courses at Merion Golf Club) and opened in 1915.  The following year, Donald Ross completed the course by adding the sand bunkers.  In 1998, the course was restored by Bob Cupp Jr. to be close to the original design. Today the course plays as a par 71, 
In 2006, the hole numbers were rearranged to improve logistics.

In 1929, the club opened a nine-hole course designed by William S. Flynn and Howard C. Toomey. A second nine holes were built by Flynn disciple William Gordon in 1957, and the rearranged layout became known as the Pines Course. Three holes were removed in 1990 to make room for a practice facility, with replacements designed by Al Janis.

In 1984, the Marriott Corporation bought the club, and turned it into a resort open to the public. Marriott sold the property to LaSalle Hotel Properties in 1998, but continued to manage it until 2009. Marriott Vacation Club owns the adjacent Fairway Villas vacation condominium complex and the Pines course, but both courses and recreational facilities are seamlessly open to guests from the hotel and the vacation club. Dolce Hotels and Resorts took over management of the hotel and Troon Golf was retained to manage the golf courses.

In 2009, Seaview was honored by Golfweek magazine as one of the “Best Courses You Can Play” in New Jersey, and by Golf World magazine with a 2009 Readers' Choice Award.

In July 2010, it was reported that the Richard Stockton College of New Jersey was negotiating with LaSalle Hotel Properties regarding the possible purchase of the hotel. On September 1, 2010, Stockton College finalized the deal for 20 million.

Tournaments
The Seaview Country Club hosted the 1942 PGA Championship, then a match play event. Sam Snead won the final match at 2 & 1 over Jim Turnesa to claim the first of his seven major championships. He closed out the match by holing a  chip shot for birdie on the 35th hole.  A composite course was used for the event, using the front nine of the Bay Course coupled with the nine holes designed by Flynn.

In 1986, the Bay Course hosted the inaugural Atlantic City Classic, an LPGA Tour event, and did so again the following year.  The tournament, by then named the ShopRite LPGA Classic, returned in 1998 and remained at the club through 2006, and was revived as an annual event in 2010.

Scorecard

Sources:

References

External links
Official hotel site
Official golf site
A number of pictures of the Bay Course

1914 establishments in New Jersey
Buildings and structures in Atlantic County, New Jersey
Galloway Township, New Jersey
Golf clubs and courses in New Jersey
Golf clubs and courses designed by Donald Ross
College golf clubs and courses in the United States
Hotels in New Jersey
Tourist attractions in Atlantic County, New Jersey
Sports venues completed in 1914